Alzheimer's Society is a United Kingdom care and research charity for people with dementia and their carers. It operates in England, Wales and Northern Ireland, while its sister charities Alzheimer Scotland and Alzheimer's Society of Ireland cover Scotland and the Republic of Ireland respectively.

Despite its name, the charity does not exclusively help people with Alzheimer's disease. There are many types of dementia, which is an umbrella term. Dementia types include vascular dementia, dementia with Lewy bodies, frontotemporal dementia, Korsakoff's syndrome, Creutzfeldt–Jakob disease, HIV-related cognitive impairment, mild cognitive impairment, and other rarer causes of dementia.

It is a membership organisation, which works to improve the quality of life of people affected by dementia in England, Wales and Northern Ireland. Many of the 25,000 members have personal experience of dementia, as carers, health professionals or people with dementia themselves.

The society relies on voluntary donations from the public through fundraising and other activities. It is a registered Charity No. 296645, registered as a company limited by guarantee and registered in England No. 2115499. Its registered office is at 43-44 Crutched Friars, London, EC3N 2AE.

The Chief Executive of the Alzheimer's Society is Kate Lee, who replaced Jeremy Hughes on 2 March 2020.

History 
The organisation was formed in 1979, when two people with extensive experience of caring for relatives with dementia discussed the pressing need to raise awareness of dementia and to improve the quality of care, support and information for people with dementia and their carers.

This led to the creation of the Alzheimer's Disease Society. A steering committee was formed, consisting of carers and medical professionals, and the first annual general meeting was held on 13 September 1980. This first AGM was attended by 98 members and supporters. The first Newsletter was published in January 1981. A development officer was employed at around this time, and the first branches were established in Oxford and Bromley in 1980 and 1981 respectively. One of the Society's earliest contributions to research, as described in the Newsletter of January 1981, was a request for brain tissue donations to help support research studies.

Through the 1980s and 1990s the society continued to grow, with volunteer committees establishing branches across England, Wales and Northern Ireland. At the AGM in 1999 members of the society agreed the change of name to Alzheimer's Society.

By 2003 the Society had a turnover of £30 million, with over 230 branches across England, Wales and Northern Ireland. In 2009/10 the Society's income had grown to £58.7 million and it currently (2012) has a network of over 2000 services.

As of 2019 the Society had an income of £107 million, £80 million of which was from public donations.

Kate Lee's appointment in 2020 was brought forward by six weeks following allegations in The Guardian that the outgoing chief executive Jeremy Hughes had bullied staff. In May 2020, ThirdSector magazine reported that the regulator, the Charity commission found the society had "acted in line with their legal duties", in view of the fact that allegations of £750,000 NDA payments were not substantiated and staff could report inappropriate behaviour. Commenting on the result, The Guardian stated that the commission had admitted failing to investigate the original complaint properly in 2018 or interview complainants whilst the chair of the Alzheimer's trustees, Stephen Hill, said the society wanted to ensure best practice and had reviewed its procedures.

Activities

The society:
 has 230 local branches provide support and information for people with dementia and their carers
 provides information and support for people with dementia and their carers by telephone and online, including factsheets which can be downloaded
 supports research along the themes of "cause, cure, care", by making research grants and providing the "Dementia Knowledge Centre", whose catalogue is available online
 provides information for health and care professionals to help them to care for people with dementia
 campaigns for the rights of people with dementia and their carers, including awareness-raising and lobbying.
 released an iPhone app to spread awareness of dementia
is one of three founding funders of the UK Dementia Research Institute, a joint £290 million investment with the Medical Research Council and Alzheimer's Research UK.

Vision and mission
The society's vision is "a world without dementia".

Their mission is to:
change the face of dementia research
demonstrate best practice in dementia care and support
provide the best advice and support to anyone dealing with dementia
influence the state and society to enable those affected by dementia to live as they wish to live.

By pursuing these four goals together they hope to mobilise thousands of people. With them they hope to "reduce the impact of dementia on lives today and create a world without dementia tomorrow".

Criticism of animal research
In 2011, Animal Aid challenged four charities that are the focus of their "Victims of Charity" campaign – Cancer Research UK, the British Heart Foundation, Parkinson's UK and Alzheimer's Society – to a public debate on the scientific and moral issues relating to their funding of animal experiments. PETA also includes Alzheimer's Society on its list of charities who test on animals.

Alzheimer's Society has stated that it supports involving animals in medical research, and that it considers animal research has contributed to advances in vaccination, drugs, surgical techniques and better understanding of the biology of diseases and medical conditions including Alzheimer's disease and dementia. However, it has also noted the ethical concerns involved, and stated that animals should be used in restricted circumstances, that any animals used for research should be treated humanely, and that alternative techniques should be employed where possible.

See also
Alzheimer's Research UK

References

External links
 Official Alzheimer's Society website
 Alzheimer Scotland 
 The Alzheimer Society of Ireland

 Alzheimer's Society Library:Dementia Catalogue
 Talking Point forum - an online community for people with dementia and their carers, family and friends to discuss all aspects of the condition.

Alzheimer's and dementia organizations
Health charities in the United Kingdom
Organisations based in the City of London
Organizations established in 1979
1979 establishments in the United Kingdom
Mental health organisations in the United Kingdom